Palmer Road may refer to:

Roads
 Palmer Road, designated as Highway 156, in Canada
 Palmer Road, designated as County Road 9, in Yonkers, New York
 Palmer Road, the original alignment and name of the Glenn Highway between Anchorage and Palmer, Alaska;  extant segments parallel today's highway

Places
 Palmer Road, Prince Edward Island, a community in Prince Edward Island, Canada
 Palmer Road North, Prince Edward Island, a settlement in Prince Edward Island, Canada